Impresa (full name: IMPRESA Sociedade Gestora de Participações Sociais SA) is a Portuguese media conglomerate, headquartered in Paço de Arcos, in Oeiras municipality. It is the owner of SIC TV channel, and Expresso newspaper, among other leading media, like several magazine publications. A third online business segment was launched under the name Impresa Digital.

The company, which was founded by Francisco Pinto Balsemão, is listed on the Euronext Lisbon stock exchange.

History
The origins of Impresa goes back to 1972. In 1991 the company established a holding company, the Balsemão group. Next year it started the first private television channel, SIC, in Portugal.

In 2011 the company established Media Rumo SA in Angola.

Television
 SIC
 SIC Notícias
 SIC Mulher
 SIC Radical
 SIC K
 SIC Caras
 SIC Internacional
 SPT

Publications (Impresa Publishing)
In 2018 Portuguese company Trust in News (TIN) acquired the magazines owned by Impresa, except Expresso and Blitz.
 Activa
 Arquitectura & Construção
 Caras
 Caras Decoração
 Casa Cláudia
 Courrier Internacional
 Exame
 Exame Informática
 FHM (ceased publication on 22 February 2010)
 Jornal de Letras
 Mística
 Telenovelas
 Visão

Digital (Impresa Digital)
 Escape
 Info Portugal
 Aeiou
 Olhares
 Mygames (now a magazine)

References

External links
Impresa
Impresa Publishing

 
Mass media companies established in 1972
Companies listed on Euronext Lisbon
Portuguese companies established in 1972
Mass media companies of Portugal